No Man of Her Own may refer to:
 No Man of Her Own (1950 film), an American film noir drama
 No Man of Her Own (1932 film), an American pre-Code romantic comedy-drama film